Creta (also Creta Station and Eldorado) is an unincorporated community along Oklahoma State Highway 6 in Jackson County, Oklahoma, United States. It is at latitude 34.517 and longitude -99.55. The elevation is 1,352 feet. Greta is 6.5 miles west of Olustee and 10 miles south-southeast of Duke. It is on the south bank of Gypsum Creek.

References

Populated places in Jackson County, Oklahoma
Unincorporated communities in Oklahoma